Cheonjiyeon Waterfall is a waterfall on Jeju Island, South Korea. Literally, the name Cheonjiyeon means sky (Ch'eon) connected with land (ji). It is one of the main tourist attractions on Jeju-do. Though water always falls in one particular area, depending on the amount of recent rain, the water may spread out. Two small dams help keep the water at a specific level. Large volcanic rocks form landbridges that allow tourists to pose for photographs in front of the falls. These falls are characterized by its trachyte andesite rocks. The source of Cheonjiyeon Waterfall is a spring that comes out of the floor of the Somban Stream. The stream Yeonhee-chun is the source of the waterfall. The waterfall is one of the three famous waterfalls of Jeju, the other two being Cheonjeyeon Waterfall and Jeongbang Waterfall.

In order to reach the waterfall, visitors must walk on a landscaped trail. Near the beginning of the path is a traditional Korean raft called t'e-u (테우), symbolizing Korean culture. It is the most popular at night, because the falls are illuminated. At night, the "Hidden Face," a formation of rocks, may be visible with the night lights, and the falls are popular for lovers. The Cheonjiyeon Waterfall is also known for its diverse plant and animal life, as the path to the waterfall goes through a garden of subtropical plants.  Migratory ducks, Elaeocarpus sylvestris var. ellipticus (Natural Monument no. 163), Psilotum nudum, and Castanopsis cuspidata var.
sieboldii, Xylosma congesta, and Camellia are some examples of the flora and fauna around the falls. Just before reaching the falls on the path, one must cross a bridge from which a wide variety of koi fish can be seen below. Along the way are three piles of stacked or balanced rocks that are a common sight throughout the whole of South Korea. In olden days, a person would place a small stone under a larger stone and pray for the health and prosperity of their family. Its pond is known for being a habitat of the marbled eel (Anguilla marmorata), which is mainly active at night. Known as the Mutae (무태) eel, it is classified in Korea as Natural Monument no. 27.

See also
Jeju-do

References

External links

Cheonjiyeon Waterfall Tourist Information
Cheonjiyeon Waterfall
Map of Cheonjiyeon Waterfall's location

Waterfalls of South Korea